Venray is a railway station located in Venray, Netherlands. It is situated on the Nijmegen–Venlo railway. The train services are operated by Arriva.

Train services
The following local train services call at this station:
Stoptrein: Nijmegen–Venlo–Roermond
Stoptrein: Nijmegen–Venray

Bus services 
 Line 80: Venlo Station–Blerick–Sevenum–Horst–Venray–Ysselsteyn–Deurne
 Line 87: Well–Wanssum–Oostrum–Venray Station–Venray–Leunen–Castenray–Horst
 Line 88: Venray Station–Oostrum–Wanssum–Meerlo–Tienray–Swolgen–Broekhuizenvorst–Broekhuizen–Lottum–Grubbenvorst–Blerick–Venlo

External links
NS website 
Dutch public transport travel planner 
Arriva Website 

Railway stations in Limburg (Netherlands)
Venray